Clara Louise Tunison (22 Sep 1872 – 21 May 1899) was an American composer and organist, who is best known for composing songs which she published under the name Louise Tunison.

Tunison was born in New Jersey to Edward and Emily A. Tunison. Little is known about her education. Her song "Memories" was sung on Broadway by Dorothy Morton in the 1899 production of An Arabian Girl and 40 Thieves  at the Herald Square Theatre. The same year, the music and lyrics to "Forget Me Not," "Memories," and "'Twas But a Dream" were published in the New York Journal newspaper. "'Twas But a Dream" was performed in vaudeville shows. "Dying Rose" and "Song of a Heart" were produced on piano rolls by the Aeolian Company, and "Song of a Heart" was recorded on Victor 31692.

Tunison was only 26 years old when she died of heart disease in New York City. Her songs were published by T. B. Harms & Co. They include:

"Dying Rose"
"Forget Me Not"
"Good Night"
"Memories"
"Next Summer"
"Song of a Heart"
"'Twas But a Dream"

External links 
 
 Hear the Victor 31692 recording of "Song of a Heart"

References 

American women composers
1872 births
1899 deaths
American songwriters
19th-century American women musicians